Sergio Guerrero (1921–2008) was a Mexican composer of film scores.

Selected filmography
 Love for Sale (1951)
 Arrabalera (1951)
 A Galician Dances the Mambo (1951)
 Full Speed Ahead (1951)
 What Has That Woman Done to You? (1951)
 The Masked Tiger (1951)
 Passionflower (1952)
 Magdalena (1955)
 Yesenia (1971)
 Roots of Blood (1978)

References

Bibliography 
 Ronald Schwartz. Latin American Films, 1932-1994: A Critical Filmography. McFarland, 2005.

External links 
 

1921 births
2008 deaths
Mexican composers
People from Mexico City